Flies are insects of the order Diptera.

Flies may also refer to:

People
 Bernhard Flies, 18th century amateur composer and doctor of medicine
 The Flies, nickname of NASA Astronaut Group 23

Books
 "Flies" (Asimov short story) (1953), by Isaac Asimov
 "Flies" (Silverberg short story) (1967), by Robert Silverberg
 The Flies (1943), a play by Jean-Paul Sartre

Music
 The Flies (English band), an English psychedelic pop band
 The Flys (US band), an American post-grunge group
 The Flys (UK band), an English punk band
 "Flies (song)", by Death Grips from Year of the Snitch
 "Flies", by Red Fang from Only Ghosts

See also 

 Fly (disambiguation)
 The Fly (disambiguation)